Sheeler is a surname. Notable people with the surname include:

Charles Sheeler (1883–1965), American modernist painter and photographer
Musya S. Sheeler (1908–1981), Russian dancer

See also

Sheller